IgNight – Grand Finale (stylized as igNIGHT) was a nighttime show performed nightly at Six Flags Great America amusement park in Gurnee, Illinois, United States. It replaced Glow in the Park Parade, which was a nighttime parade.

History

The show
IgNight transformed Hometown Square when it premiered in June 2013. The show would start at park closing every night until August 13 and ran for about 25 minutes. The show features video projections, lasers, pyrotechnics, live singing, live dancing, and fireworks. IgNight journeys from the Great Chicago Fire to the present during the show.

Setlist
Several types of new and old music are used throughout the show. Thirteen songs were used in the show:

Chicago by Frank Sinatra
Hit The Lights by Selena Gomez
Tonight Tonight by Hot Chelle Rae
Elevate by Big Time Rush
All of the Lights (very brief) by Kanye West
Light Up the Sky by Duncan
Turn Up The Music by Chris Brown
What Makes You Beautiful by One Direction
Fire Burning by Sean Kingston
Without You by David Guetta
Put Your Hearts Up by Ariana Grande
We Are Young by Fun.
Make the World Move by Christina Aguilera
Cupid Shuffle by Cupid
Party Rock Anthem by LMFAO
Girl on Fire by Alicia Keys
My Songs Know What You Did in the Dark (Light Em Up) (finale) by Fall Out Boy
Firework by Katy Perry

Experience
The show begins with a girl reading her great grandma Elizabeth's journal again. In the journal, her grandma meets a boy and they are having a great time until The Chicago Fire ruins their fun. Then they go to present time and the girl is told to not think about the past and go into the city and have some fun at Club IgNight. Then, a DJ comes out and starts a dance party. In the middle of the show, the same thing that happened to her Grandma Elizabeth happens to her, without a disaster. To end the show, My Songs Know What You Did in the Dark by Fall Out Boy plays while many rounds of pyrotechnics launch and go along with the music.

See also
 2013 in amusement parks
 Luminosity – Ignite the Night!

References

Six Flags Great America
Fireworks in the United States